Leicester United Football Club was an English football team based in the East Midlands city of Leicester, Leicestershire. They were formed in 1900.  They were wound up in 1996, four years away from their centenary. In March 2023 Steven Eljay (Real Name Michael Stevenson) , Alan Hopkins, Kym Paling & Netty Stevenson backed by Scott Moore and The Richard Moore Sports Community Interest Company reignited the club from the ashes in an attempt to bring the club back to its former glory days starting with the Grassroots Junior Section in the 2023/24 Season with the Community at the heart of its ethos.

History
In 1900 a group of quarry workers founded Enderby Town Football Club. The secretary was a Sunderland supporter and he was determined the club should wear the colours of his favourite team, red and white stripes.

The club's first ground was at George Street, Enderby. Town established itself in local minor leagues before moving up to the Leicestershire Senior League.
After winning Division 2 in 1958-59 the club became a dominant force in the 1960s, winning the Division One title three times and also lifting the Leicestershire Senior Cup on three occasions.

The club moved into the East Midlands Regional League in the 1970-71 season, winning the league and cup double in their first season and retaining the league title in their second.

In 1972 the club was elected to the Southern League to replace Hereford United, who had been promoted to the Football League Division 4.
The Leicestershire Senior Cup was won again in 1972-73 and 1978-79.

The 1980s saw a change in fortune, the club being relegated from the Premier Division in 1982, after which the club moved to a new ground, United Park, in Winchester Road, Blaby. At the same time their name was changed to Leicester United. Form continued to decline and United finished bottom of the Midland Division in 1984-85.

United achieved promotion back to the Premier Division after finishing second in 1986-87 but were relegated again two years later.

FA Cup runs
The club's best FA Cup run came in the 1977–78 season (as Enderby Town) where they reached the 1st Round proper of the competition. They lost 6–1 away to AP Leamington in that round.

In 1986–87, they played their only ever 'home' match at the home stadium of local rivals Leicester City. It was an FA Cup 1st Qualifying Round Replay in which United beat North Ferriby United 4–2.

The club's last FA Cup tie was a 5–2 away defeat to Bilston Town in the 2nd Qualifying Round in the 1995–96 season.

League record
For many years, Leicester United were the second top side in Leicestershire. The highest the club finished was 8th in the Southern League Premier Division in 1987–88. The Southern League Premier Division at that time was the 6th tier of English football. The club were relegated the following season.

In their final season, 1995–96, they finished 16th in the Southern League Midlands Division. They went out of business just a few games into the start of the 1996–97 season due to financial problems, one of their final games being a victory over Grantham Town.

See also
Leicester United F.C. players
Enderby Town Football Club Ltd v The Football Association Ltd

References

Association football clubs established in 1900
Association football clubs disestablished in 1996
Sport in Leicester
Defunct football clubs in England
Leicester City Football League
Leicestershire Senior League
Southern Football League clubs
1900 establishments in England
1996 disestablishments in England
East Midlands Regional League
Defunct football clubs in Leicestershire